Radovanje may refer to:
 Radovanje, Serbia, a village near Velika Plana, Serbia
 Radovanje, Croatia, a village near Oriovac, Croatia

Serbo-Croatian place names